

Events

Pre-1600
 247 – Philip the Arab marks the millennium of Rome with a celebration of the ludi saeculares.
 395 – Emperor Arcadius marries Aelia Eudoxia, daughter of the Frankish general Flavius Bauto. She becomes one of the more powerful Roman empresses of Late Antiquity.
711 – Islamic conquest of Hispania: Moorish troops led by Tariq ibn Ziyad land at Gibraltar to begin their invasion of the Iberian Peninsula (Al-Andalus).
1296 – First War of Scottish Independence: John Balliol's Scottish army is defeated by an English army commanded by John de Warenne, 6th Earl of Surrey at the Battle of Dunbar.
1509 – Pope Julius II places the Italian state of Venice under interdict.
1521 – Battle of Mactan: Explorer Ferdinand Magellan is killed by natives in the Philippines led by chief Lapulapu.
1539 – Official founding of the city of Bogotá, New Granada (nowadays Colombia), by Nikolaus Federmann and Sebastián de Belalcázar.
1565 – Cebu is established becoming the first Spanish settlement in the Philippines.
1595 – The relics of Saint Sava are incinerated in Belgrade on the Vračar plateau by Ottoman Grand Vizier Sinan Pasha; the site of the incineration is now the location of the Church of Saint Sava, one of the largest Orthodox churches in the world

1601–1900
1650 – The Battle of Carbisdale: A Royalist army from Orkney invades mainland Scotland but is defeated by a Covenanter army.
1667 – Blind and impoverished, John Milton sells Paradise Lost to a printer for £10, so that it could be entered into the Stationers' Register.
1805 – First Barbary War: United States Marines and Berbers attack the Tripolitan city of Derna (The "shores of Tripoli" part of the Marines' Hymn).
1813 – War of 1812: American troops capture York, the capital of Upper Canada, in the Battle of York. 
1861 – American President Abraham Lincoln suspends the writ of habeas corpus.

1901–present
1906 – The State Duma of the Russian Empire meets for the first time.
1909 – Sultan of Ottoman Empire Abdul Hamid II is overthrown, and is succeeded by his brother, Mehmed V.
1911 – Following the resignation and death of William P. Frye, a compromise is reached to rotate the office of President pro tempore of the United States Senate.
1927 – Carabineros de Chile (Chilean national police force and gendarmerie) are created.
1936 – The United Auto Workers (UAW) gains autonomy from the American Federation of Labor.
1941 – World War II: German troops enter Athens.
1945 – World War II: The last German formations withdraw from Finland to Norway. The Lapland War and thus, World War II in Finland, comes to an end and the Raising the Flag on the Three-Country Cairn photograph is taken.
  1945   – World War II: Benito Mussolini is arrested by Italian partisans in Dongo, while attempting escape disguised as a German soldier.
1953 – Operation Moolah offers $50,000 to any pilot who defects with a fully mission-capable Mikoyan-Gurevich MiG-15 to South Korea. The first pilot was to receive $100,000.
1967 – Expo 67 officially opens in Montreal, Quebec, Canada with a large opening ceremony broadcast around the world. It opens to the public the next day.
1976 – Thirty-seven people are killed when American Airlines Flight 625 crashes at Cyril E. King Airport in Saint Thomas, U.S. Virgin Islands.
1978 – John Ehrlichman, a former aide to U.S. President Richard Nixon, is released from the Federal Correctional Institution, Safford, Arizona, after serving 18 months for Watergate-related crimes.
  1978   – The Saur Revolution begins in Afghanistan, ending the following morning with the murder of Afghan President Mohammed Daoud Khan and the establishment of the Democratic Republic of Afghanistan.
  1978   – Willow Island disaster: In the deadliest construction accident in United States history, 51 construction workers are killed when a cooling tower under construction collapses at the Pleasants Power Station in Willow Island, West Virginia.
1981 – Xerox PARC introduces the computer mouse.
1986 – The city of Pripyat and surrounding areas are evacuated due to Chernobyl disaster.
1987 – The U.S. Department of Justice bars Austrian President Kurt Waldheim (and his wife, Elisabeth, who had also been a Nazi) from entering the US, charging that he had aided in the deportations and executions of thousands of Jews and others as a German Army officer during World War II.
1989 – The April 27 demonstrations, student-led protests responding to the April 26 Editorial, during the Tiananmen Square protests of 1989.
1992 – The Federal Republic of Yugoslavia, comprising Serbia and Montenegro, is proclaimed.
  1992   – Betty Boothroyd becomes the first woman to be elected Speaker of the British House of Commons in its 700-year history.
  1992   – The Russian Federation and 12 other former Soviet republics become members of the International Monetary Fund and the World Bank.
1993 – Most of the Zambia national football team lose their lives in a plane crash off Libreville, Gabon en route to Dakar, Senegal to play a 1994 FIFA World Cup qualifying match against Senegal.
1994 – South African general election: The first democratic general election in South Africa, in which black citizens could vote. The Interim Constitution comes into force.
2005 – Airbus A380 aircraft had its maiden test flight.
2006 – Construction begins on the Freedom Tower (later renamed One World Trade Center) in New York City.
2007 – Estonian authorities remove the Bronze Soldier, a Soviet Red Army war memorial in Tallinn, amid political controversy with Russia.
  2007   – Israeli archaeologists discover the tomb of Herod the Great south of Jerusalem.
2011 – The 2011 Super Outbreak devastates parts of the Southeastern United States, especially the states of Alabama, Mississippi, Georgia, and Tennessee. Two hundred five tornadoes touched down on April 27 alone, killing more than 300 and injuring hundreds more.
2012 – At least four explosions hit the Ukrainian city of Dnipropetrovsk with at least 27 people injured.
2018 – The Panmunjom Declaration is signed between North and South Korea, officially declaring their intentions to end the Korean conflict.

Births

Pre-1600
85 BC – Decimus Junius Brutus Albinus, Roman politician and general (d. 43 BC)
1468 – Frederick Jagiellon, Primate of Poland (d. 1503)
1564 – Henry Percy, 9th Earl of Northumberland (d. 1632)
1556 – François Béroalde de Verville, French writer (d. 1626)
1593 – Mumtaz Mahal, Mughal empress buried at the Taj Mahal (d. 1631)

1601–1900
1650 – Charlotte Amalie of Hesse-Kassel, Queen Consort of Denmark (1670-1699) (d. 1714)
1654 – Charles Blount, English deist and philosopher (d. 1693)
1701 – Charles Emmanuel III of Sardinia (d. 1773)
1718 – Thomas Lewis, Irish-born American surveyor and lawyer (d. 1790)
1748 – Adamantios Korais, Greek-French philosopher and scholar (d. 1833)
1755 – Marc-Antoine Parseval, French mathematician and theorist (d. 1836)
1759 – Mary Wollstonecraft, English philosopher, historian, and novelist (d. 1797)
1788 – Charles Robert Cockerell, English architect, archaeologist, and writer (d. 1863)
1791 – Samuel Morse, American painter and inventor, co-invented the Morse code (d. 1872)
1812 – William W. Snow, American lawyer and politician (d. 1886)
  1812   – Friedrich von Flotow, German composer (d. 1883)
1820 – Herbert Spencer, English biologist, anthropologist, sociologist, and philosopher (d. 1903)
1822 – Ulysses S. Grant, American general and politician, 18th President of the United States (d. 1885)
1840 – Edward Whymper, English-French mountaineer, explorer, author, and illustrator (d. 1911)
1848 – Otto, King of Bavaria (d. 1916)
1850 – Hans Hartwig von Beseler, German general and politician (d. 1921)
1853 – Jules Lemaître, French playwright and critic (d. 1914)
1857 – Theodor Kittelsen, Norwegian painter and illustrator (d. 1914)
1861 – William Arms Fisher, American composer and music historian (d. 1948)
1866 – Maurice Raoul-Duval, French polo player (d. 1916)
1875 – Frederick Fane, Irish-born, English cricketer (d. 1960)
1880 – Mihkel Lüdig, Estonian organist, composer, and conductor (d. 1958)
1882 – Jessie Redmon Fauset, American author and poet (d. 1961)
1887 – Warren Wood, American golfer (d. 1926)
1888 – Florence La Badie, Canadian actress (d. 1917)
1891 – Sergei Prokofiev, Russian pianist, composer, and conductor (d. 1953)
1893 – Draža Mihailović, Serbian general (d. 1946)
  1893   – Allen Sothoron, American baseball player, coach, and manager (d. 1939)
1894 – George Petty, American painter and illustrator (d. 1975)
  1894   – Nicolas Slonimsky, Russian pianist, composer, and conductor (d. 1995)
1896 – Rogers Hornsby, American baseball player, coach, and manager (d. 1963)
  1896   – William Hudson, New Zealand-Australian engineer (d. 1978)
  1896   – Wallace Carothers, American chemist and inventor of nylon (d. 1937)
1898 – Ludwig Bemelmans, Italian-American author and illustrator (d. 1962)
1899 – Walter Lantz, American animator, producer, screenwriter, and actor (d. 1994)
1900 – August Koern, Estonian politician and diplomat, Estonian Minister of Foreign Affairs in exile (d. 1989)

1901–present
1902 – Tiemoko Garan Kouyaté, Malian educator and activist (d. 1942)
1904 – Cecil Day-Lewis, Anglo-Irish poet and author (d. 1972)
  1904   – Nikos Zachariadis, Greek politician (d. 1973)
1905 – John Kuck, American javelin thrower and shot putter (d. 1986)
1906 – Yiorgos Theotokas, Greek author and playwright (d. 1966)
1910 – Chiang Ching-kuo, Chinese politician, 3rd President of the Republic of China (d. 1988)
1911 – Bruno Beger, German anthropologist and ethnologist (d. 2009)
  1911   – Chris Berger, Dutch sprinter and footballer (d. 1965)
1912 – Jacques de Bourbon-Busset, French author and politician (d. 2001)
  1912   – Zohra Sehgal, Indian actress, dancer, and choreographer (d. 2014)
1913 – Philip Abelson, American physicist and author (d. 2004)
  1913   – Irving Adler, American mathematician, author, and academic (d. 2012)
  1913   – Luz Long, German long jumper and soldier (d. 1943)
1916 – Robert Hugh McWilliams, Jr., American sergeant, lawyer, and judge (d. 2013)
  1916   – Enos Slaughter, American baseball player and manager (d. 2002)
1917 – Roman Matsov, Estonian violinist, pianist, and conductor (d. 2001)
1918 – Sten Rudholm, Swedish lawyer and jurist (d. 2008)
1920 – Guido Cantelli, Italian conductor (d. 1956)
  1920   – Mark Krasnosel'skii, Ukrainian mathematician and academic (d. 1997)
  1920   – James Robert Mann, American colonel, lawyer, and politician (d. 2010)
  1920   – Edwin Morgan, Scottish poet and translator (d. 2010)
1921 – Robert Dhéry, French actor, director, and screenwriter (d. 2004)
1922 – Jack Klugman, American actor (d. 2012)
  1922   – Sheila Scott, English nurse and pilot (d. 1988)
1923 – Betty Mae Tiger Jumper, Seminole chief (d. 2011)
1924 – Vernon B. Romney, American lawyer and politician, 14th Attorney General of Utah (d. 2013)
1925 – Derek Chinnery, English broadcaster (d. 2015)
1926 – Tim LaHaye, American minister, activist, and author (d. 2016)
  1926   – Basil A. Paterson, American lawyer and politician, 59th Secretary of State of New York (d. 2014)
  1926   – Alan Reynolds, English painter and educator (d. 2014)
1927 – Coretta Scott King, African-American activist and author (d. 2006)
  1927   – Joe Moakley, American soldier, lawyer, and politician (d. 2001)
1929 – Nina Ponomaryova, Russian discus thrower and coach (d. 2016)
1931 – Igor Oistrakh, Ukrainian violinist and educator (d. 2021)
1932 – Anouk Aimée, French actress
  1932   – Pik Botha, South African lawyer, politician, and diplomat, 8th South African Ambassador to the United States (d. 2018)
  1932   – Casey Kasem, American disc jockey, music historian, radio celebrity, and voice actor; co-created American Top 40 (d. 2014)
  1932   – Chuck Knox, American football coach (d. 2018)
  1932   – Derek Minter, English motorcycle racer (d. 2015)
  1932   – Gian-Carlo Rota, Italian-American mathematician and philosopher (d. 1999)
1933 – Peter Imbert, Baron Imbert, English police officer and politician, Lord Lieutenant for Greater London (d. 2017)
1935 – Theodoros Angelopoulos, Greek director, producer, and screenwriter (d. 2012)
  1935   – Ron Morris, American pole vaulter and coach
1936 – Geoffrey Shovelton, English singer and illustrator (d. 2016)
1937 – Sandy Dennis, American actress (d. 1992)
  1937   – Robin Eames, Irish Anglican archbishop
  1937   – Richard Perham, English biologist and academic (d. 2015)
1938 – Earl Anthony, American bowler and sportscaster (d. 2001)
  1938   – Alain Caron, Canadian ice hockey player (d. 1986)
1939 – Judy Carne, English actress and comedian (d. 2015)
  1939   – Stanisław Dziwisz, Polish cardinal
1941 – Fethullah Gülen, Turkish preacher and theologian
  1941   – Dilip Kumar Chakrabarti, Indian archaeologist
  1941   – Lee Roy Jordan, American football player
1942 – Ruth Glick, American author
  1942   – Jim Keltner, American drummer
1943 – Helmut Marko, Austrian race car driver and manager
1944 – Michael Fish, English meteorologist and journalist
  1944   – Cuba Gooding Sr., American singer (d. 2017)
  1944   – Herb Pedersen, American singer-songwriter and guitarist 
1945 – Martin Chivers, English footballer and manager
  1945   – Jack Deverell, English general
  1945   – Helen Hodgman, Scottish-Australian author
  1945   – Terry Willesee, Australian journalist and television host
  1945   – August Wilson, American author and playwright (d. 2005)
1946 – Franz Roth, German footballer
1947 – G. K. Butterfield, African-American soldier, lawyer, and politician
  1947   – Nick Greiner, Hungarian-Australian politician, 37th Premier of New South Wales
  1947   – Pete Ham, Welsh singer-songwriter and guitarist (d. 1975)  
  1947   – Keith Magnuson, Canadian ice hockey player and coach (d. 2003)
  1947   – Ann Peebles, American soul singer-songwriter
1948 – Frank Abagnale Jr., American security consultant and criminal
  1948   – Josef Hickersberger, Austrian footballer, coach, and manager
  1948   – Kate Pierson, American singer-songwriter and bass player
1949 – Grant Chapman, Australian businessman and politician
1950 – Jaime Fresnedi, Filipino politician
  1950   – Paul Lockyer, Australian journalist (d. 2011)
1951 – Ace Frehley, American guitarist and songwriter 
1952 – Larry Elder, American lawyer and talk show host
  1952   – George Gervin, American basketball player
  1952   – Ari Vatanen, Finnish race car driver and politician
1953 – Arielle Dombasle, French-American actress and model
1954 – Frank Bainimarama, Fijian commander and politician, 8th Prime Minister of Fiji
  1954   – Herman Edwards, American football player, coach, and sportscaster
  1954   – Mark Holden, Australian singer, actor, and lawyer
1955 – Gudrun Berend, German hurdler (d. 2011)
  1955   – Eric Schmidt, American engineer and businessman
1956 – Bryan Harvey, American singer-songwriter and guitarist (d. 2006)
  1956   – Jeff Probyn, English rugby player, coach, and manager
1957 – Willie Upshaw, American baseball player and manager
1959 – Sheena Easton, Scottish-American singer-songwriter, actress, and producer
  1959   – Marco Pirroni, English singer-songwriter, guitarist, and producer 
1960 – Mike Krushelnyski, Canadian ice hockey player and coach
1961 – Andrew Schlafly, American lawyer and activist, founded Conservapedia
1962 – Ángel Comizzo, Argentinian footballer and manager
  1962   – Seppo Räty, Finnish javelin thrower and coach
  1962   – Im Sang-soo, South Korean director and screenwriter
  1962   – Andrew Selous, English soldier and politician
1963 – Russell T Davies, Welsh screenwriter and producer
1965 – Anna Chancellor, English actress
1966 – Peter McIntyre, Australian cricketer 
  1966   – Yoshihiro Togashi, Japanese illustrator
1967 – Willem-Alexander, King of the Netherlands
  1967   – Tommy Smith, Scottish saxophonist, composer, and educator
  1967   – Erik Thomson, Scottish-New Zealand actor
  1967   – Jason Whitlock, American football player and journalist
1968 – Dana Milbank, American journalist and author
1969 – Cory Booker, African-American lawyer and politician
  1969   – Darcey Bussell, English ballerina
1971 – Olari Elts, Estonian conductor
1972 – Nigel Barker, English photographer and author
  1972   – Almedin Civa, Bosnian footballer and coach
1973 – Duško Adamović, Serbian footballer
  1973   – Sharlee D'Angelo, Swedish bass player and songwriter 
  1973   – Sébastien Lareau, Canadian tennis player
1974 – Frank Catalanotto, American baseball player
  1974   – Richard Johnson, Australian footballer
1975 – Rabih Abdullah, American football player
  1975   – Chris Carpenter, American baseball player and manager
  1975   – Pedro Feliz, Dominican baseball player
  1975   – Kazuyoshi Funaki, Japanese ski jumper 
1976 – Isobel Campbell, Scottish singer-songwriter and cellist 
  1976   – Sally Hawkins, English actress
  1976   – Walter Pandiani, Uruguayan footballer
  1976   – Faisal Saif, Indian director, screenwriter, and critic
1979 – Will Boyd, American bass player 
  1979   – Natasha Chokljat, Australian netball player
  1979   – Vladimir Kozlov, Ukrainian wrestler
1980 – Sybille Bammer, Austrian tennis player
  1980   – Talitha Cummins, Australian journalist
  1980   – Christian Lara, Ecuadorian footballer
1981 – Joey Gathright, American baseball player
  1981   – Patrik Gerrbrand, Swedish footballer
1982 – François Parisien, Canadian cyclist
  1982   – Alexander Widiker, German rugby player
1983 – Ari Graynor, American actress and producer
  1983   – Martin Viiask, Estonian basketball player
1984 – Pierre-Marc Bouchard, Canadian ice hockey player
  1984   – Daniel Holdsworth, Australian rugby league player
1985 – José António de Miranda da Silva Júnior, Brazilian footballer
  1985   – Meselech Melkamu, Ethiopian runner
1986 – Jenna Coleman, English actress
  1986   – Hayley Mulheron, Scottish netball player
  1986   – Dinara Safina, Russian tennis player
1987 – Taylor Chorney, American ice hockey player
  1987   – Elliott Shriane, Australian speed skater
  1987   – William Moseley, English actor
  1987   – Wang Feifei, Chinese singer and actress
1988 – Joeri Dequevy, Belgian footballer
  1988   – Kris Thackray, English footballer
  1988   – Semyon Varlamov, Russian ice hockey player
  1988   – Lizzo, American singer and rapper
1989 – Lars Bender, German footballer
  1989   – Sven Bender, German footballer
  1989   – Dmytro Kozban, Ukrainian footballer
1990 – Trude Raad, Norwegian deaf track and field athlete
1991 – Isaac Cuenca, Spanish footballer
  1991   – Lara Gut, Swiss skier
1992 – Keenan Allen, American football player
1994 – Corey Seager, American baseball player
1995 – Nick Kyrgios, Australian tennis player
1997 – Josh Onomah, English footballer

Deaths

Pre-1600
 630 – Ardashir III of Persia (b. 621)
1160 – Rudolf I, Count of Bregenz (b. 1081)
1272 – Zita, Italian saint (b. 1212)
1321 – Nicolò Albertini, Italian cardinal statesman (b. c. 1250)
1353 – Simeon of Moscow, Grand Prince of Moscow and Vladimir
1403 – Maria of Bosnia, Countess of Helfenstein (b. 1335)
1404 – Philip II, Duke of Burgundy (b. 1342)
1463 – Isidore of Kiev (b. 1385)
1521 – Ferdinand Magellan, Portuguese sailor and explorer (b. 1480)
1599 – Maeda Toshiie, Japanese general (b. 1538)

1601–1900
1605 – Pope Leo XI (b. 1535)
1607 – Edward Cromwell, 3rd Baron Cromwell, Governor of Lecale (b. 1560)
1613 – Robert Abercromby, Scottish priest and missionary (b. 1532)
1656 – Jan van Goyen, Dutch painter and illustrator (b. 1596)
1694 – John George IV, Elector of Saxony (b. 1668)
1695 – John Trenchard, English politician, Secretary of State for the Northern Department (b. 1640)
1702 – Jean Bart, French admiral (b. 1651)
1782 – William Talbot, 1st Earl Talbot, English politician, Lord Steward of the Household (b. 1710)
1813 – Zebulon Pike, American general and explorer (b. 1779)
1873 – William Macready, English actor and manager (b. 1793)
1882 – Ralph Waldo Emerson, American poet and philosopher (b. 1803)
1893 – John Ballance, Irish-born New Zealand journalist and politician, 14th Prime Minister of New Zealand (b. 1839) 
1896 – Henry Parkes, English-Australian businessman and politician, 7th Premier of New South Wales (b. 1815)

1901–present
1915 – John Labatt, Canadian businessman (b. 1838)
  1915   – Alexander Scriabin, Russian pianist and composer (b. 1872)
1932 – Hart Crane, American poet (b. 1899)
1936 – Karl Pearson, English mathematician and academic (b. 1857)
1937 – Antonio Gramsci, Italian sociologist, linguist, and politician (b. 1891)
1938 – Edmund Husserl, Czech mathematician and philosopher (b. 1859)
1949 – Benjamin Faunce, American druggist and businessman (b. 1873)
1952 – Guido Castelnuovo, Italian mathematician and statistician (b. 1865)
1961 – Roy Del Ruth, American director, producer, and screenwriter (b. 1893)
1962 – A. K. Fazlul Huq, Bangladeshi-Pakistani lawyer and politician, Pakistani Minister of the Interior (b. 1873)
1965 – Edward R. Murrow, American journalist (b. 1908)
1967 – William Douglas Cook, New Zealand farmer, founded the Eastwoodhill Arboretum (b. 1884)
1969 – René Barrientos, Bolivian soldier, pilot, and politician, 55th President of Bolivia (b. 1919)
1970 – Arthur Shields, Irish rebel and actor (b. 1896)
1972 – Kwame Nkrumah, Ghanaian politician, 1st President of Ghana (b. 1909)
1973 – Carlos Menditeguy, Argentinian race car driver and polo player (b. 1914)
1977 – Stanley Adams, American actor and screenwriter (b. 1915)
1988 – Fred Bear, American hunter and author (b. 1902)
1989 – Konosuke Matsushita, Japanese businessman, founded Panasonic (b. 1894)
1992 – Olivier Messiaen, French organist and composer (b. 1908)
  1992   – Gerard K. O'Neill, American physicist and astronomer (b. 1927)
1995 – Katherine DeMille, Canadian-American actress (b. 1911)
  1995   – Willem Frederik Hermans, Dutch author, poet, and playwright (b. 1921)
1996 – William Colby, American diplomat, 10th Director of Central Intelligence (b. 1920)
  1996   – Gilles Grangier, French director and screenwriter (b. 1911)
1998 – John Bassett, Canadian journalist and politician (b. 1915)
  1998   – Carlos Castaneda, Peruvian-American anthropologist and author (b. 1925)
  1998   – Anne Desclos, French journalist and author (b. 1907)
  1998   – Browning Ross, American runner and soldier (b. 1924)
1999 – Al Hirt, American trumpet player and bandleader (b. 1922)
  1999   – Dale C. Thomson, Canadian historian, author, and academic (b. 1923)
  1999   – Cyril Washbrook, English cricketer (b. 1914)
2002 – George Alec Effinger, American author (b. 1947)
  2002   – Ruth Handler, American inventor and businesswoman, created the Barbie doll (b. 1916)
2005 – Red Horner, Canadian ice hockey player (b. 1909)
2006 – Julia Thorne, American author (b. 1944)
2007 – Mstislav Rostropovich, Russian cellist and conductor (b. 1927)
2009 – Frankie Manning, American dancer and choreographer (b. 1914)
  2009   – Woo Seung-yeon, South Korean model and actress (b. 1983)
2009 – Feroz Khan (actor), Indian Actor, Film Director & Producer (b. 1939)
2011 – Marian Mercer, American actress and singer (b. 1935)
2012 – Daniel E. Boatwright, American soldier and politician (b. 1930)
  2012   – Bill Skowron, American baseball player (b. 1930)
2013 – Aída Bortnik, Argentinian screenwriter (b. 1938)
  2013   – Lorraine Copeland, Scottish archaeologist (b. 1921)
  2013   – Antonio Díaz Jurado, Spanish footballer (b. 1969)
  2013   – Jérôme Louis Heldring, Dutch journalist and author (b. 1917)
  2013   – Aloysius Jin Luxian, Chinese bishop (b. 1916)
  2013   – Mutula Kilonzo, Kenyan lawyer and politician, Kenyan Minister of Justice (b. 1948)
2014 – Yigal Arnon, Israeli lawyer (b. 1929)
  2014   – Vujadin Boškov, Serbian footballer, coach, and manager (b. 1931)
  2014   – Daniel Colchico, American football player and coach (b. 1935)
  2014   – Harry Firth, Australian race car driver and manager (b. 1918)
2015 – Gene Fullmer, American boxer (b. 1931)
  2015   – Verne Gagne, American football player, wrestler, and trainer (b. 1926)
  2015   – Alexander Rich, American biologist, biophysicist, and academic (b. 1924)
2017 – Vinod Khanna, Indian actor, producer and politician (b. 1946)
  2017   – Sadanoyama Shinmatsu, Japanese sumo wrestler (b. 1938)
2021 – Manoj Das, Indian writer (b. 1934)
2022 – Liao Guoxun, Chinese politician  (b.1963)

Holidays and observances
Christian feast days:
Anthimus of Nicomedia
Assicus
Floribert of Liège
John of Constantinople
Liberalis of Treviso
Pollio
Virgin of Montserrat
Zita
Origen Adamantius
April 27 (Eastern Orthodox liturgics)
Day of Russian Parliamentarism (Russia)
Day of the Uprising Against the Occupying Forces (Slovenia)
Flag Day (Moldova)
Freedom Day (South Africa)
Independence Day, celebrates the independence of Sierra Leone from United Kingdom in 1961.
Independence Day, celebrates the independence of Togo from France in 1960.
King's Day (Netherlands, Aruba, Curaçao, Sint Maarten) (celebrated on April 26 if April 27 falls on a Sunday)
National Veterans' Day (Finland)

References

External links

 BBC: On This Day
 
 Historical Events on April 27

Days of the year
April